The 1992 Iowa Hawkeyes football team represented the University of Iowa in the 1992 NCAA Division I-A football season as a member of the Big Ten Conference. The team was coached by Hayden Fry and played their home games at Kinnick Stadium.

Schedule

Roster

Game summaries

NC State

Miami (FL)

Sources: Box Score and Game Story

Eventual Heisman Trophy winner Gino Torretta threw for a Kinnick Stadium record 433 yards.

Iowa State

Colorado

Michigan

Wisconsin

Illinois

Purdue

Ohio State

Indiana

Northwestern

Sources: Box Score and Game Story

Minnesota

Awards and honors
Mike Devlin, Center - Big Ten Offensive Lineman of the Year, First-team All-American

Team players in the 1993 NFL Draft

References

Iowa
Iowa Hawkeyes football seasons
Iowa Hawkeyes football